The 1995 Copa América football tournament was staged in Uruguay. It was won by Uruguay, who beat Brazil 5–3 in the penalty shootout after a 1–1 draw in the final. All 10 CONMEBOL members took part, with Mexico and the United States invited in order to reach 12 teams.

The United States were the surprise of the tournament, beating defending champions Argentina 3–0 and winning the group. The United States went on to defeat Mexico on penalties in the second round but then lost to Brazil 1–0 in the semi-finals. They then fell to Colombia 4–1 in the third-place game, finishing fourth overall.

In this edition of the tournament, extra time was not played if a match was drawn after 90 minutes. Instead it went straight to a penalty shootout.

Venues

Squads
For a complete list of all participating squads: 1995 Copa América squads

Match officials

 Argentina
 Javier Castrilli

 Bolivia
 Pablo Peña

 Brazil
 Márcio Rezende de Freitas

 Chile
 Salvador Imperatore

 Colombia
 Óscar Ruiz

 Ecuador
 Alfredo Rodas

 Mexico
 Marco Antonio Rodríguez
 Arturo Brizio Carter

 Paraguay
 Félix Benegas

 Peru
 Alberto Tejada

 Uruguay
 Ernesto Filippi
 Eduardo Dluzniewski

 United States
 Raúl Domínguez

 Venezuela
 Paolo Borgosano

Group stage
The teams were divided into three groups of four teams each.

Each team plays one match against each of the other teams within the same group. Three points are awarded for a win, one point for a draw and zero points for a defeat.

First and second placed teams, in each group, advance to the quarter-finals.
The best third placed team and the second best third placed team, also advance to the quarter-finals.

 Tie-breaker
 If teams finish leveled on points, the following tie-breakers are used:
 greater goal difference in all group games;
 greater number of goals scored in all group games;
 winner of the head-to-head match between the teams in question;
 drawing of lots.

Group A

Group B

Group C

Ranking of third-placed teams
At the end of the first stage, a comparison was made between the third-placed teams of each group. The two third-placed teams with the best results advanced to the quarter-finals.

Knockout stage

Quarter-finals

Semi-finals

Third-place match

Final

Result

Goal scorers
With four goals, Gabriel Batistuta and Luis García both ended the tournament as top scorers. In total, 69 goals were scored by 45 different players, with three of them credited as own goals.

4 goals
  Gabriel Batistuta
  Luis García

3 goals

  Abel Balbo
  Túlio
  Freddy Rincón
  Eric Wynalda
  Marcelo Otero

2 goals

  Edmundo
  Ivo Basay
  Faustino Asprilla
  José Cardozo
  Juan Villamayor
  Daniel Fonseca
  Enzo Francescoli
  José Luis Dolgetta

1 goal

  Diego Simeone
  Demetrio Angola
  Marco Etcheverry
  Miguel Mercado
  Mauricio Ramos
  Carlos Sánchez
  Aldair
  Leonardo
  Ronaldão
  Zinho
  Sebastián Rozental
  Luis Quiñónez
  Carlos Valderrama
  Energio Díaz
  José Mora
  Eduardo Espinoza
  Carlos Gamarra
  Adriano Samaniego
  Roberto Palacios
  Edgardo Adinolfi
  Pablo Bengoechea
  Gustavo Poyet
  Marcelo Saralegui
  Frank Klopas
  Alexi Lalas
  Joe-Max Moore
  Gabriel Miranda

Own goals
  René Higuita
  Iván Hurtado
  Jorge Campos

Statistics

References

External links

 Copa América 1995 at RSSSF

 
1995
1995
1995 in Uruguayan football
1995 in South American football
1995 in American soccer
1994–95 in Mexican football
July 1995 sports events in South America
Sports competitions in Montevideo
1990s in Montevideo
Sport in Paysandú
Rivera
Maldonado Department